"Crosstown" is a 1940 song recorded by Glenn Miller and His Orchestra. The song was written by James Cavanaugh, John Redmond, and Nat Simon.

Background
"Crosstown" was released as an RCA Bluebird 78 single in 1940 by Glenn Miller and His Orchestra featuring Jack Lathrop on vocals. The single reached no. 9 on the Billboard pop singles chart in a single-week chart appearance. The B side was "What's Your Story, Morning Glory?"

Album Appearances

The recording appeared on the 2005 Avid Entertainment collection 
Glenn Miller: The Glenn Miller Story, Vols. 9-10 and the 1991 RCA Bluebird compilation box set The Complete Glenn Miller and His Orchestra (1938-1942).

References

Sources

Flower, John (1972). Moonlight Serenade: a bio-discography of the Glenn Miller Civilian Band. New Rochelle, NY: Arlington House. .
Miller, Glenn (1943). Glenn Miller's Method for Orchestral Arranging. New York: Mutual Music Society. ASIN: B0007DMEDQ
Simon, George Thomas (1980). Glenn Miller and His Orchestra. New York: Da Capo paperback. .
Simon, George Thomas (1971). Simon Says. New York: Galahad. .
Schuller, Gunther (1991). Volume 2 of The Swing Era:the Development of Jazz, 1930–1945 /. New York: Oxford University Press. .

Glenn Miller songs
1940 songs
Jazz compositions
Songs with music by Nat Simon
Songs written by James Cavanaugh (songwriter)